Henrik Pedersen (born 2 January 1978) is a Danish football manager, currently in charge of Vendsyssel FF.

Career
Pedersen worked as a youth manager at several Danish clubs before joining Red Bull Salzburg.

In 2014 he got his first job as a first team manager, when he became manager of HB Køge in the Danish 1st Division. He left on 23 December 2015 on mutual consent.

In 2016 he became Jens Keller's assistant manager at 1. FC Union Berlin. Pedersen was sacked together with Keller on 4 December 2017.

On 30 May 2018, he was named new manager of Eintracht Braunschweig in the 3. Liga replacing Torsten Lieberknecht. He was sacked on 10 October 2018.

On 20 June 2019, he signed a -year contract with Norwegian club Strømsgodset. He left the club on 9 April 2021, after allegations arose that he had made racist remarks during his time with the club.

On 2 July 2021, Pedersen was announced new manager of Danish 1st Division club Vendsyssel FF.

References

1978 births
Living people
Danish football managers
Danish expatriate football managers
HB Køge managers
1. FC Union Berlin non-playing staff
Eintracht Braunschweig managers
Strømsgodset Toppfotball managers
Danish expatriate sportspeople in Austria
Expatriate football managers in Germany
Danish expatriate sportspeople in Germany
Expatriate football managers in Norway
Danish expatriate sportspeople in Norway
3. Liga managers
Eliteserien managers
Danish 1st Division managers